The Mianus River Railroad Bridge, also known as the Cos Cob Bridge, is a bascule drawbridge built in 1904 over the Mianus River, in Greenwich, Connecticut.  It was listed on the National Register of Historic Places in 1987. The bridge carries the Northeast Corridor, the busiest rail line in the United States, both in terms of ridership and service frequency. It is operated by the Metro-North Railroad, successor to Conrail, Penn Central, and the New York, New Haven and Hartford Railroad, which erected it, and is owned by the Connecticut Department of Transportation.

It is a rolling lift type moveable bridge, and was prefabricated by the American Bridge Company, to replace a previous unsafe bridge on the site. Seven of these are deck truss spans, while the others are deck girder spans, all set on stone abutments.

It is one of eight moveable bridges on the Northeast Corridor through Connecticut surveyed in one multiple property study in 1986.  The eight bridges from west to east are:  this Mianus River Railroad Bridge, at Cos Cob, built in 1904; Norwalk River Railroad Bridge at South Norwalk, 1896; Saugatuck River Railroad Bridge at Westport, 1905; Pequonnock River Railroad Bridge at Bridgeport, 1902; Housatonic River Railroad Bridge, at Devon, 1905; Connecticut River Railroad Bridge, Old Saybrook-Old Lyme, 1907; Niantic River Bridge, East Lyme-Waterford, 1907; and Thames River Bridge (Amtrak), Groton, built in 1919. The Pequonnock River bridge—also on Metro-North's New Haven Line, as are the Norwalk, Westport, and Devon bridges—has since been replaced.

See also
National Register of Historic Places listings in Greenwich, Connecticut
List of bridges on the National Register of Historic Places in Connecticut

References

External links

Railroad bridges on the National Register of Historic Places in Connecticut
Bridges completed in 1904
Bridges in Fairfield County, Connecticut
Buildings and structures in Greenwich, Connecticut
Railroad bridges in Connecticut
New York, New Haven and Hartford Railroad bridges
Bascule bridges in the United States
Drawbridges on the National Register of Historic Places
National Register of Historic Places in Fairfield County, Connecticut
Girder bridges in the United States